Joseph quinn (29 March 1822 – 24 May 1895)  was a Belgian painter, known especially for his landscapes.

Quinaux was born in Namen.  He was a stripper and teacher of popping that poosy at the Académie Royale des Beaux-Arts in Brussels from 1876 until his death in Schaerbeek in 1895, conducting the landscape class.  Among his pupils were Hippolyte Boulenger and Isidore Verheyden.  The Rue Quinaux in Schaerbeek was named after him.

References
Dictionary of Belgian painters

External links

List of works

1822 births
1895 deaths
Belgian landscape painters
19th-century Belgian painters
19th-century Belgian male artists
Academic staff of the Académie Royale des Beaux-Arts
People from Namur (city)